The Ukraine Council of Ministers may refer to:

 Council of Ministers of the Ukrainian SSR, highest executive and administrative body of the Ukrainian Soviet Socialist Republic
 Council of Ministers (Ukrainian State) or Cabinet of Ministers of Ukraine, commonly referred to as the Government of Ukraine